Rio Tinto Alcan is a Canada-based mining company. Headquartered in Montreal, Quebec, it is a subsidiary of global mining conglomerate Rio Tinto. It was created on 15 November 2007 as the result of the merger between Rio Tinto's Canadian subsidiary and Canadian company Alcan.

The company is the global leader of aluminium mining and production, above its one time parent Alcoa (from which it split in 1928), Rusal, and some Chinese public companies.

History
Founded in 1902 as the Canadian unit of Alcoa, it was spun off in 1928.  R.E. Powell left Alcoa to become Vice President of the Aluminium Company of Canada (later Alcan) in Montreal, was President from 1937 to 1957 and was then Chancellor of McGill University from 1957 to 1964.

Alcan has gone through several name changes:

 Northern Aluminum Company Limited – 1902
 Aluminum Company of Canada Limited – 1925
 registers the name Alcan – 1945
 added French name Aluminium du Canada, Limitée – 1965
 introduce the use of the name Alcan Aluminium Limited in English and Alcan Aluminium Limitée 1966; later used as the official name of the parent company in 1987
 Alcan Inc. – 2001
 Rio Tinto Alcan Inc. – 2008 (current company name)
 In May 2015, the corporation announced that the name Alcan would gradually disappear to only keep Rio Tinto

In 2008 Alcan Inc was amalgamated with Rio Tinto Canada Holding Inc following Rio Tinto Canada Holding Inc's acquisition of a majority of the share capital in Alcan Inc. Following the acquisition which was carried out by way of amalgamation Rio Tinto Canada Holding Inc was renamed Rio Tinto Alcan Inc.

From 1935 to 1945, the use of Aluminum in Alcan's name was being disputed by Alcoa, but a decision by the United States Circuit Court of Appeals ended the legality of the company's name.

Historically, Alcan was one of Canada's most important and powerful companies, and was listed as the sixth largest in 1975.

In 1982 the company acquired the British Aluminium Company, renaming the operation British Alcan. In 1999, Alcan made a failed attempt to make a three-way merger between it and Algroup (Alusuisse Lonza Group) of Switzerland and Pechiney of France. The proposed merger was blocked by the European Commission due to fears of anti-competition. After the deal fell through, Alcan acquired Algroup in 2000. Then in 2003, Alcan acquired Pechiney, completing the original three-way merger plan of 1999.

In July 2007, Hindalco Industries announced it is buying the stake of Alcan in the Utkal Alumina Project in Orissa, India marking an exit of Alcan from the project.

On 20 January 2009 Rio Tinto Alcan announced plans to close the Beauharnois smelter and reduce output from the Vaudreuil refinery; both facilities are in Quebec. It is part of a larger plan to reduce aluminum output by a further 6% (following a cut of 5% in late 2008), while cutting 1,100 jobs worldwide. The company will also sell its half-interest in the Chinese Alcan Ningxia joint venture.

Rio Tinto sold assets from Alcan, including Alcan Packaging and Alcan Composites, in 2009, and Alcan Engineered Products in 2011. Alcan Packaging was acquired by Australian packaging giant Amcor. Alcan Composites was sold to the Swiss firm Schweiter Technologies and re-branded in 2010 to 3A Composites.

After the union's contract expired on 31 December 2011 the company has locked out nearly 800 employees at its smelter plant in Saguenay-Lac-Saint-Jean, Quebec since midnight of the end of the year. The action was following nearly 3 months of unsuccessful bargaining and the further plant operations will be handled by the staff.

In 2015, Rio Tinto Alcan is scheduled to move its HQ from the Maison Alcan and relocate to the Deloitte Tower, which will be situated between Windsor Station and the Bell Centre.

Product groups

Bauxite and alumina
Alcan owns, operates or has an interest in six bauxite mines and deposits, five smelter-grade alumina refineries and six specialty alumina plants. Its Bauxite & Alumina group refines bauxite ore into smelter-grade alumina for Alcan's Primary Metal group and external customers and specialty-grade alumina for third parties. It also owns an extensive transportation network, including trucking, rail, marine shipping and port facilities worldwide. In September 2019, the firm's aluminium was certified by the Aluminium Stewardship Initiative (ASI) to be responsibly produced.

Primary metal
Alcan Primary Metal group included Alcan's aluminum smelting facilities and power generation installations, smelting technology and equipment sales, engineering services and aluminum trading operations, anode and cathode production facilities and aluminum fluoride plants.

Alcan owned or had an interest in 22 smelters in 11 countries and regions.

Alcan was based in Montreal, Quebec and had revenues of US$23.6 billion and 68,000 employees in 61 countries in 2007.

Corporate governance
As of 6 March 2007, members of the board of directors of Alcan were: 
Roland Berger
L. Denis Desautels
Dick Evans
Yves Fortier
Jean-Paul Jacamon
William R. Loomis Jr.
Yves Mansion
Christine Morin-Postel
H. Onno Ruding
Guy Saint-Pierre
Gerhard Schulmeyer
Paul M. Tellier
Milton K. Wong

The last board of directors of Alcan prior to its renaming and becoming a wholly owned subsidiary of Rio Tinto PLC. Rio Tinto added several Alcan directors to its corporate board in London, including Dick Evans, who was Chief executive of Rio Tinto Alcan.

Takeover
Alcoa Inc. announced a hostile take over bid for its progeny on 7 May 2007, in a deal worth US$27 billion. The combined companies would have formed the largest aluminum producer in the world. On 22 May 2007, Alcan's board of directors unanimously recommended that shareholders reject Alcoa's unsolicited offer to acquire Alcan. The board determined that the offer was inadequate in multiple respects and was contrary to the best interests of Alcan's shareholders. On 12 July 2007, Alcan announced a friendly takeover deal with Anglo-Australian mining giant Rio Tinto, worth US$38.1 billion. Alcan's board of directors unanimously recommended the deal to shareholders. Alcoa withdrew its bid later in the day. On 25 October 2007, the merger was completed and Rio Tinto Alcan (the amalgamation of Alcan and Rio Tinto Aluminum) became the world's largest aluminum company. However, while Rio Tinto won overwhelming shareholder support on 25 October 2007, the acquisition was not formally consummated until 15 November 2007, the date on which the corporate name changed and integration was finally completed.

See also

 Aluminium smelting
 British Alcan
 Kemano, British Columbia, Canada
 Nechako Reservoir
 List of alumina refineries
 List of aluminium smelters

References

External links

 
 Alcan is named Americas Most Admired Metals Company by Fortune
 L’impact de la perte de contrôle d’une entreprise florissante la prise de contrôle d’Alcan par Rio Tinto
 Continuity Agreement Between Alcan and Gouvernement of Québec 2006
 Rio Tinto Alcan AP Technology

Aluminium companies of Canada
Mining companies of Canada
Alcan
Rio Tinto (corporation) subsidiaries
Canadian subsidiaries of foreign companies
Manufacturing companies based in Montreal
Companies based in Montreal
Non-renewable resource companies established in 1902
Companies formerly listed on the London Stock Exchange